This is a list of tennis players who have represented the Kosovo Davis Cup team in an official Davis Cup match. Kosovo have taken part in the competition since 2016.

Players
This table is current through the end of the 2019 Davis Cup Europe Zone Group IV matches (July 20, 2019).

References

Lists of Davis Cup tennis players
Tennis in Kosovo